The North Carolina Film Office, originally called the "North Carolina Film Commission," is a member of the Association of Film Commissioners International.

History

Founded in 1980 by Governor James B. Hunt, the office was commissioned to help facilitate and provide a base of operation for North Carolina's burgeoning film industry.  Governor Hunt appointed William "Bill" Arnold to lead the office. In 1984, producer Dino De Laurentiis created De Laurentiis Entertainment Group.  He built and based a studio complex (now EUE/Screen Gems) in Wilmington, North Carolina.  The area quickly became one of the busiest production centers for film and television east of Hollywood.  The North Carolina Film Office was created during a time when new technology, audience demand for location authenticity, and Hollywood’s need for lower production costs were driving filmmakers to search distant sites throughout the United States for fresh places to make movies.

With Bill Arnold leading, the North Carolina Film Commission witnessed a dramatic increase in production during the 1980s and the 1990s.  Notable films during this time include: The Color Purple (1985),  Dirty Dancing (1987),  Bull Durham (1988),  Days of Thunder (1990),  Sleeping with the Enemy (1991),  Last of the Mohicans (1992),  The Fugitive (1993),  and The Crow (1994).  In 1998 Wilmington, NC became the home of the WB's critically acclaimed television network series Dawson's Creek. The series remained in Wilmington until 2003 when it was cancelled and replaced with One Tree Hill—a series on The WB/CW that calls North Carolina "home." One Tree Hill ended in 2012 after nine seasons.

While Wilmington, NC continued to sustain itself with television, the international film climate began to shift out of North Carolina's favor. In an effort to keep production costs even cheaper, early 2000 saw production companies making films internationally. The North Carolina Film Commission was made most aware of this trend when it lost Charles Frazier's North Carolina tale, Cold Mountain, to the country of Romania. Hoping to bring an international industry back to the United States, many law-makers across the US began creating incentives packages to encourage filming in individual states.  North Carolina's legislature decided on pursuing a competitive incentive program.  On August 8, 2006, Governor Mike F. Easley signed into law a legislation offering productions a full 15% tax credit on a minimum $250,000 spend in North Carolina (and not to exceed a $7.5M credit.)   Since this program's inception, the NC Film Office has seen a substantial increase in production, as have other state's that have established similar programs.  Since 2006, the North Carolina Film Office has recruited the following films: George Clooney's Leatherheads (2008),  Nights in Rodanthe (2008)  starring Richard Gere and Diane Lane, The Marc Pease Experience (2008)  with Ben Stiller, and Bolden! (2008),  a film about the life of jazz legend Buddy Bolden.

In September 2006, Commissioner Bill Arnold retired after 26 years of service to North Carolina's film industry.  The North Carolina Film Office is now part of the NC Department of Commerce's Division of Tourism, Film and Sports Development.  Aaron Syrett (former Director of the Utah Film Commission) was hired as Director of the North Carolina Film Office in spring 2007; his tenure ended at the end of July 2014.  While building upon North Carolina's legacy, Syrett is taking a 21st-century approach to boost the global visibility of North Carolina's resources.

Organization

Responsibilities 
The North Carolina Film Office has 3 main responsibilities: market the State of North Carolina, serve the film industry, and serve the State of North Carolina.  The office actively works to create a healthy climate in which to grow film industry economic development.  A marketing agency as well, the film office educates the film industry on North Carolina's incentives program, promotes the state's infrastructure, and showcases North Carolina's diverse locations.

Projects (including film, television and commercial) are actively recruited and nurtured by the office.  The office encourages industry-related companies to headquarter or have satellite companies in the state.  The office ultimately serves the State of North Carolina by keeping and creating jobs in North Carolina for film crew and related businesses.  As such, the film office must serve the film industry in an efficient and engaging capacity.  The office hosts location scouts for producers and also provides on-the-ground assistance before and during filming.  The North Carolina Film Office is the official liaison between the industry and state agencies for state property use, highway assistance, and other issues.

The office has always maintained sophisticated communications with the film industry.  Not only has it maintained an informative website, but also it has supported the Full Frame Documentary Film Festival and for 9 years sponsored the American Film Market.  Every spring the office participates in the Locations Trade Show hosted by the Association of Film Commissioners International in Santa Monica, CA.  Members of the office make regular trips to Los Angeles, CA to meet with producers and also visit Park City, UT every January to network at the Sundance Film Festival.

Regional film commissions
The North Carolina Film Office works in tandem with six affiliate offices that are both publicly and privately maintained.  All are certified by the Association of Film Commissioners International.
 Charlotte Regional Film Commission 
 Triangle Regional Film Commission 
 Eastern North Carolina Regional Film Commission 
 Piedmont-Triad Film Commission 
 Western North Carolina Film Commission 
 Wilmington Regional Film Commission, Inc.

Film Council
The North Carolina Film Office has a staff of 4.  Until July 2014, the director of the North Carolina Film Office was Aaron Syrett (2007-2014).  In addition to working with affiliate commissions, the North Carolina Film Office is also supported by a governor-appointed group who offer advice and guidance in the interest of North Carolina's film industry.  Notable members include casting director, Craig Fincannon, founder of the Full Frame Documentary Film Festival, Nancy Buirski, and former president of Universal Pictures, Thom Mount.  Studio executive Frank Capra Jr. was also a member of the council until his death in 2007.

Film incentives program
As of January 2015, North Carolina has implemented a new Film and Entertainment Grant program. Funds from the $10 million grant will serve as a rebate of up to 25% on qualified expenses/purchases of productions.
The previous tax credit ended as of January 1, 2015, after the Republican-controlled N.C. legislature chose to let the film incentives legislation sunset as one piece of a larger plan to end most incentive funding, in favor of lower corporate income taxes.
Complete information on the new grant program is available at

Notable films and television made in North Carolina

Alphabetically listed

28 Days
A Walk to Remember
Being There
Blue Velvet
Bull Durham
The Butcher's Wife
The Color Purple
The Crow
Dawson’s Creek
Days of Thunder
Dirty Dancing
Divine Secrets of the Ya-Ya Sisterhood
Dream a Little Dream
Eastbound and Down
Empire Records
Firestarter
Forrest Gump
The Fugitive
The Green Mile
Hannibal
Homeland
The Hunt for Red October
The Hunger Games
I Know What You Did Last Summer
Iron Man 3
Junebug
Kiss the Girls
Last of the Mohicans
Leatherheads
Main Street
The Marc Pease Experience
Matlock
Message in a Bottle
Mr. Destiny
Muppets from Space
Nights in Rodanthe
One Tree Hill
Patch Adams
Revolution
Richie Rich
Safe Haven
The Secret Life of Bees
Shallow Hal
Sleeping with the Enemy
Sleepy Hollow
Surface
Super Mario Brothers
Talladega Nights: The Ballad of Ricky Bobby
Teen Spirit
Teenage Mutant Ninja Turtles
Teenage Mutant Ninja Turtles II: The Secret of the Ooze
To Gillian on Her 37th Birthday
Under the Dome
Weekend at Bernie's

See also
Films shot in North Carolina

References

External links 
 North Carolina Film Office website
 The Hollywood Reporter, Made in America: Incentive to Stay
 The Hollywood Reporter: North Carolina
 Film Junkie's Guide to North Carolina By Connie Nelson and Floyd Harris
 Association of Film Commissioners International (AFCI)

Government of North Carolina
Communications in North Carolina
Film commissions in the United States
Mass media companies
Cinema of North Carolina